Leo Cooper may refer to:
Leo Cooper (publisher) (1934–2013), British publisher
Leo Cooper (historian) (1922–), Polish–Australian historian